Chekist narrowly means an agent of the Cheka (ChK).

It may relate to:

Cheka, first of a succession of Soviet state security organizations
Chekism, term for influence of Soviet state security organizations
The Chekist, a 1992 Russian film